Mokro (Serbo-Croatian for "wet") may refer to:

Mokro, Pale, Bosnia and Herzegovina
Mokro, Konjic, Bosnia and Herzegovina
Mokro, Šavnik, Montenegro
Mokro Polje, Croatia
Duboko Mokro, Bosnia and Herzegovina

See also
Mokronoge (disambiguation), toponym in Bosnia and Herzegovina
Mokronozi, Rudo, Bosnia and Herzegovina
Mokroluški potok, Serbia